Sphaerics was a set of three volumes on spherical geometry written by Theodosius of Bithynia in the 2nd century BC. These proved essential in the restoration of Euclidean geometry to Western civilization, when brought back from the Islamic world during the crusades and translated back from Arabic into Latin.

History
Theodosius appears to have written Sphaerics as a supplement to Euclid's Elements, allowing its application in astronomy. Elements had lacked spherical geometry. Sphaerics had its own shortcomings, for example Hipparchus had already introduced trigonometry, but Theodosius makes no use of it, perhaps because he was basing it on an earlier work by Eudoxus.

Theodosius' primary function in this, and other, works is to gather together existing information into one place. In the first book of Sphaerics, he carefully explains that a sphere is a shape whose surface is an equal distance, in any spot, from a central point, and then goes on to examine the geometry of spheres, extensively.

The work's primary importance was in the restoration of Euclidean geometry to European knowledge, as this, and much other technology and philosophy, had been lost to Christendom, but preserved in Arabic translations during the Islamic Golden Age, then brought back to Europe during the Crusades and translated back into Latin.

References

Ancient Greek mathematical works